Tomáš Houdek (born 30 March 1981 in Třinec) is a Czech professional ice hockey defenceman who currently plays with HC Kometa Brno in the Czech Extraliga.

Houdek previously played for HC Oceláři Třinec, HC Slezan Opava, HC Olomouc, HC Hamé Zlín and HC Slovan Ústečtí Lvi.

References

External links 

 

Czech ice hockey defencemen
HC Kometa Brno players
HC Oceláři Třinec players
Living people
1981 births
Sportspeople from Třinec
AZ Havířov players
HC ZUBR Přerov players
MsHK Žilina players
HC Slovan Ústečtí Lvi players
HC Olomouc players
Czech expatriate ice hockey players in Slovakia
PSG Berani Zlín players